Saint Rita is a 2004 Italian television movie directed by Giorgio Capitani. The film is based on real life events of Augustinian nun and Saint Rita of Cascia.

Plot

Cast 

 Vittoria Belvedere as Rita Lotti
 Martin Crewes as Paolo Mancini 
  Simone Ascani as  Tommaso
 Lina Sastri as  Abbess
 Adriano Pappalardo as  Guido Cicchi
 Dietrich Hollinderbäumer as Ferdinando Mancini
  Michaela Rosen as  Teresa Mancini
  Sandro Giordano as  Bernardo Mancini
   Manolo Capissi as Giangiacomo Mancini
  Stanislao Capissi as Pietro Maria Mancini
 Sydne Rome as  Amata Lotti
  Giorgia Bongianni as  Caterina Mancini
  Mirco Petrini as  Francesco Mancini
  Sebastiano Colla as  Ludovico Cicchi
 Belinda Sinclair as  Sister Matilde 
  Giacomo Piperno as  Antonio Lotti

References

External links

2004 television films
2004 films
Italian television films
2004 biographical drama films
Films set in Italy
Italian biographical drama films
Films about religion
Films directed by Giorgio Capitani
Films set in the 14th century
Films set in the 15th century
Cultural depictions of Italian women
2000s Italian films